The University of Applied Sciences Landshut (Hochschule für angewandte Wissenschaften Landshut) is a Fachhochschule in Landshut, between Munich and Regensburg, with over 5000 students and over 100 professors. Its main focus areas are technology, social work and business. It was founded in 1978 under the name Fachhochschule Landshut (Landshut Technical University), and renamed in 2008.

General information

The University of Applied Sciences Landshut has six faculties:

 Business Administration
 Social Work
 Electrical and Industrial Engineering
 Computer Science
 Mechanical Engineering
 Interdisciplinary Studies

External links
 Official website (English)
 Official website (German)

References

Universities and colleges in Bavaria
Landshut
Universities of Applied Sciences in Germany